Perspectives on Sexual and Reproductive Health is a bimonthly peer-reviewed medical journal covering reproductive health. It was established in 1969 as Family Planning Perspectives, obtaining its current name in 2002.

It is published by Wiley-Blackwell on behalf of the Guttmacher Institute. The editor-in-chief is Dore Hollander. According to the Journal Citation Reports, the journal has a 2016 impact factor of 3.571, ranking it 1st out of 26 journals in the category "Demography" and 1st out of 43 journals in the category "Family studies."

References

External links

Wiley-Blackwell academic journals
Publications established in 1969
Obstetrics and gynaecology journals
Bimonthly journals
English-language journals
Demography journals
Reproductive health journals